Holly Hamilton is a BBC journalist and presenter, on BBC Breakfast on BBC One, the Victoria Derbyshire programme on BBC Two and the BBC News channel.

Hamilton grew up in Greyabbey, Northern Ireland, was educated at Regent House School, Newtownards, and earned a master's degree in Politics and French from the University of Dundee.

She is married to fellow television and radio presenter Connor Phillips. They are patrons of the Northern Ireland Council for Integrated Education (NICIE) and, as part of their role, they officially opened Corran Integrated Primary School in Larne, County Antrim in November 2019.

References

BBC television presenters
Alumni of the University of Dundee
Living people
Year of birth missing (living people)
Television presenters from Northern Ireland
People from County Down